Llangwnnadl is a village and former civil parish in the Welsh county of Gwynedd.  The parish was abolished in 1934, and incorporated into Tudweiliog.

References

Villages in Gwynedd
Tudweiliog